The King's Whore is a 1990 drama film directed by Axel Corti and starring Timothy Dalton. It was entered into the 1990 Cannes Film Festival.

Plot
Set in the 17th century, an Italian nobleman weds an impoverished countess, who is wooed by the Duke of Piedmont and faces pressure from his entire court to succumb to his wishes.

Cast
 Timothy Dalton as Vittorio Amedeo II
 Valeria Golino as Jeanne de Luynes
 Stéphane Freiss as Le Comte di Verrua
 Robin Renucci as Charles de Luynes
 Margaret Tyzack as La Comtesse douairière
 Eleanor David as La Reine
 Paul Crauchet as Le Duc de Luynes
 Amy Werba as Heloïse
 Franco Valobra as Le Duc d'Aoste
 Francesca Reggiani as Marie Christine
 Leonardo Ruta as Le Prince Vittorio
 Luigi Bonos as 2nd Priest (as Gigi Bonos)
 Elisabeth Kaza as Countess Trevie (as Elizabeth Kaza)
 Lea Padovani as Countess Cumiana
 Anna Bonaiuto as Countess Longhi

Release
Originally picked up by Miramax Films for U.S. distribution, the film was never given the benefit of a U.S. theatrical release. The film was shown at various film festivals and in theaters overseas. The film was finally released on videocassette in 1993 by Vidmark Entertainment in the United States and in Canada by C/FP Video. In 2002, the film was released on a budget DVD by Platinum Disc.

References

External links

1990 films
1990s French-language films
1990s English-language films
1990 drama films
French drama films
Italian drama films
British drama films
Films directed by Axel Corti
Films set in Italy
Films set in the 17th century
Films set in the 18th century
Films scored by Gabriel Yared
English-language French films
English-language Italian films
1990 multilingual films
1990s British films
1990s French films